Westville is a town in New Durham Township, LaPorte County, Indiana, United States.  The population, as of the 2020 census is 5257. It is included in the Michigan City, Indiana-La Porte, Indiana Metropolitan Statistical Area.  Westville is located in Northwest Indiana, also known as The Region.

History
Westville was platted in 1851, and incorporated as a town in 1864. It was a station and shipping point at the junction of two railroads.

Rev. John Milton Whitehead lived in Westville at the time of his enlistment as a chaplain in the 15th Indiana Infantry Regiment. Whitehead received the Medal of Honor for his actions at the Battle of Stones River when he "went to the front during a desperate contest and unaided carried to the rear several wounded and helpless soldiers."

The Everel S. Smith House was listed in the National Register of Historic Places in 1990.

Geography

Demographics

2010 census
As of the census of 2010, there were 5,853 people, 1,093 households, and 705 families living in the town. The racial makeup of the town was 72.1% White, 25.1% African American, 0.2% Native American, 0.3% Asian, 1.6% from other races, and 0.7% from two or more races. Hispanic or Latino of any race were 6.3% of the population.

There were 1,093 households, of which 34.2% had children under the age of 18 living with them, 44.1% were married couples living together, 12.9% had a female householder with no husband present, 7.5% had a male householder with no wife present, and 35.5% were non-families. 29.2% of all households were made up of individuals, and 8.9% had someone living alone who was 65 years of age or older. The average household size was 2.45 and the average family size was 2.97.

The median age in the town was 33.1 years. 12% of residents were under the age of 18; 13.7% were between the ages of 18 and 24; 47.3% were from 25 to 44; 21.4% were from 45 to 64; and 5.5% were 65 years of age or older. The gender makeup of the town was 76.9% male and 23.1% female.

2000 census
As of the census of 2000, there were 2,116 people, 897 households, and 556 families living in the town. The racial makeup of the town was 96.27% White, 1.23% African American, 0.28% Native American, 0.28% Asian, 0.71% from other races, and 1.23% from two or more races. Hispanic or Latino of any race were 0.90% of the population.

There were 898 households, out of which 30.8% had children under the age of 18 living with them, 45.4% were married couples living together, 12.0% had a female householder with no husband present, and 38.0% were non-families. 30.4% of all households were made up of individuals, and 11.0% had someone living alone who was 65 years of age or older. The average household size was 2.36 and the average family size was 2.93.

In the town, the population was spread out, with 26.0% under the age of 18, 8.1% from 18 to 24, 31.0% from 25 to 44, 23.1% from 45 to 64, and 11.7% who were 65 years of age or older. The median age was 36 years. For every 100 females, there were 96.1 males. For every 100 females age 18 and over, there were 95.1 males.

The median income for a household in the town was $36,761, and the median income for a family was $44,524. Males had a median income of $33,906 versus $21,525 for females. The per capita income for the town was $18,306. About 3.3% of families and 6.3% of the population were below the poverty line, including 6.0% of those under age 18 and 4.2% of those age 65 or over.

Education
The town has a lending library, the Westville-New Durham Township Public Library. Westville residents may also request a free library card from any La Porte County Public Library branch. Purdue University Northwest's other campus, formerly Purdue North Central, is in Westville.

References

External links
 Town of Westville, Indiana website

Towns in LaPorte County, Indiana
Towns in Indiana